The New Zealand merganser (Mergus australis), also known as Auckland merganser or Auckland Islands merganser,  was a typical merganser which is now extinct.

Description
This duck was similar in size to the red-breasted merganser (Mergus serrator). The adult male had a dark reddish-brown head, crest and neck, with bluish black mantle and tail and slate grey wings. The female was slightly smaller with a shorter crest.

History
This bird was first collected when a French expedition led by the explorer Jules Dumont d'Urville on the ships L'Astrolabe and La Zelee visited the Auckland Islands in 1840. Its decline was caused by a combination of hunting and predation by introduced mammals. The bird was not flightless, but rather hard to flush; it preferred to hide between rocks when pursued. The last sighting was of a pair shot on January 9, 1902. It was not found in a 1909 search, and a thorough 1972/1973 exploration of possible habitat concluded that it was long extinct (Williams & Weller, 1974).

Subsequent fossil discoveries suggest that this merganser was previously resident in the South Island, and on Stewart Island/Rakiura in New Zealand. Fossils of a subspecies or closely related species have also been found on the Chatham Islands. There exists a short remark mentioning "a merganser" found on Campbell Island in McCormick (1842), but this may just as well refer to the semi-marine Campbell teal which is otherwise missing in his notes: he only mentions the Pacific black duck ("a New Zealand species of duck").

References

 McCormick, Robert (1842): A sketch of the Antarctic regions, embracing a few passing remarks, geographical and ornithological. Tasmanian Journal of Natural Sciences 1(4): 241–247. PDF fulltext
 Williams, G. R. & Weller, M. W.. (1974): Unsuccessful search for the Auckland Islands Merganser (Mergus australis). Notornis 21(3): 246–249. PDF fulltext
 Southern Merganser. Mergus australis. by Paul Martinson. Artwork produced for the book Extinct Birds of New Zealand, by Alan Tennyson, Te Papa Press, Wellington, 2006

Extinct birds of New Zealand
Endemic birds of New Zealand
Bird extinctions since 1500
Mergus
Fauna of the Auckland Islands
Mergansers
Birds described in 1841
Taxa named by Jacques Bernard Hombron
Taxa named by Honoré Jacquinot
Extinct birds of subantarctic islands